The  is a railway line owned and operated by the Kintetsu Railway, a Japanese private railway company, connecting Nagoya and Ise Nakagawa Station in Matsusaka, Mie Prefecture via Kuwana, Yokkaichi, Suzuka, Tsu municipalities along the Ise Bay. The official starting-point of the line is Ise-Nakagawa and the terminus is Nagoya; however, operationally trains run "down" from and "up" towards Nagoya.

The line approximately parallels the Central Japan Railway Company (JR Central) Kansai Main Line, the Ise Railway Ise Line, and the JR Central Kisei Main Line, and all three offer rapid services from Nagoya to Ise.

At Ise-Nakagawa, the line has connections to the Osaka Line to Uehommachi and Kintetsu Namba Stations of downtown Osaka, and to the Yamada Line to Ujiyamada Station and beyond Toba Station on the Toba Line and Kashikojima Station of the Shima Line, to provide touristic access to scenic Shima Peninsula and Ise Shrine.

Services
 LO  Local
Trains stop at every station.

 SE  Semi-Express
 For 
 For , 

 EX  Express
 For 

 LE  Limited Express
Seat reservations and limited express fee required.
 For 

 NS  Non-stop Limited Express
Trains for Ōsaka Namba run hourly. Trains for Kashikojima run once a day on weekends. Seat reservations and limited express fee required.
 For 
 For 
 For 

 SV  Premium Express Shimakaze
Trains for Kashikojima run once a day except on Wednesday with some exceptions. :(Seat reservations, limited express fee and special vehicle fee required.
 For 
 For

Stations

History

The first section, between Shiroko and Takadahonzan, was opened in 1915 by an independent railway operator  with rail gauge . The line was extended to Tsu-shinmachi and Kusu in 1917, and to (now) Kintetsu-Yokkaichi in 1922, the line being electrified at 1500 VDC in 1926. It was extended as an electrified line to Kuwana in 1929, and to Ise-Nakagawa the following year.

In 1936 the line was acquired by the Sangu Express Railway Co., which duplicated the Kuwana - Kusu section in 1938, the year that the Kansai Express Railway Co. opened the Nagoya - Kuwana section as electrified dual track.

In 1940 the  merged with the Kansai Express Railway Co., a predecessor of Kintetsu.

The Kusu - Hisai section was duplicated between 1937 and 1955, and the dual tracking of the line was completed in 1972 with duplication of the Hisai - Ise-Nakagawa section.

Gauge conversion
After the acquisition of a 1435mm connection to Osaka, Kintetsu passengers to that destination needed to change trains due to the difference of gauges. In 1959 the disastrous Ise-wan Typhoon destroyed the line and Kintetsu decided to convert to  gauge (standard gauge) with the reconstruction, the standard of the company to enable direct operation between Osaka and Nagoya. Today a number of Limited Express trains between Osaka and Nagoya, and between Nagoya and Ise and Shima area are operated.

Former connecting lines
 Kuwana station - The 762mm gauge Sangi Railway Hokusei Line  section to Kuwana Kyobashi operated between 1913 and 1961, being electrified in 1930 at 600 VDC, and boosted to 750 VDC in 1954.
 Edobashi station - the Ise Electric Railway  1067mm gauge line to Daijingumae opened between 1926 and 1930, and closed between 1943 and 1961.
 Tsu-shimmachi station - The Anou Railway Co. operated a  762mm gauge line to Mukumoto between 1914 and 1944. There was a  branch to Katada operated from 1917 to 1927.
 Hisai station - The Dainippon Railway Co. operated a  762mm gauge line to Ise-Kawaguchi on the Meisho Line between 1925 and 1943.

Proposed connecting line
 Toda station - The 1972 Nagoya regional transport plan proposed a subway (Line 5) from this station to Kurokawa. In 2008 it was determined the line was not economically viable.

References
This article incorporates material from the corresponding article in the Japanese Wikipedia

Nagoya Line
Rail transport in Aichi Prefecture
Rail transport in Mie Prefecture
Rail transport in Nagoya
Standard gauge railways in Japan
Railway lines opened in 1915
1067 mm gauge railways in Japan